4th/3rd Battalion, Royal New South Wales Regiment (4/3 RNSWR) is a Reserve light infantry battalion of the Australian Army. 4/3 RNSWR has been deployed on active service on many peacekeeping operations and exercises within Australia and around the world. The Battalion is currently based at Sutherland, New South Wales where it forms part of the 5th Brigade.

History

Formation
The 1987 reorganisation of the Army Reserve, involving a reduction in the number of infantry battalions across Australia, brought about a linking of the 3rd and 4th Battalions, and a public ceremony on 26 September of that year marked the presence of the new 4/3 RNSWR.

The new battalion, now extending across south-eastern New South Wales, has continued its standard training programmes in pursuit of its operational readiness objectives.

Significant groups of unit members attended the Royal Regiment of Wales Tercentenary celebrations in Cardiff, in 1989, and the 75th Anniversary Commemoration at Gallipoli in 1990, and the unit has had ongoing involvement in Australian and overseas exercise training programmes.

Recent history
Operation Anode is the Australian Defence Force's role in supporting RAMSI (Regional Assistance Mission to the Solomon Islands). Soldiers  from 4/3 RNSWR has supported RAMSI in multiple brigade led deployments as a peacekeeping force to assist local and international police force's in the re-stabilisation of the Solomon Islands in conjunction with the New Zealand, Papua New Guinea and Tongan defence forces.

Operation Astute was an Australian-led military deployment to East Timor to quell unrest and return stability in the 2006 East Timor crisis.

Operation Resolute is commanded by the joint civilian-military Border Protection Command and the ADF contributes Royal Australian Navy ships, Royal Australian Air Force aircraft and patrols from the Australian Army's Regional Force Surveillance Units as required. Soldiers from 4/3 RNSWR have been regularly deployed on OP Resolute.

Battle honours 
The 3rd Battalion received the following battle honours:

 "Suakin 1885" (inherited);
 "South Africa 1899–1902" (inherited);
 World War I: Somme 1916, Somme 1918, Pozieres, Bullecourt, Ypres 1917, Menin Road, Polygon Wood, Broodseinde, Poelcappelle, Passchendaele, Lys, Hazebrouck, Amiens, Albert 1918 (Chuignes), Hindenburg Line, Hindenburg Line, Epehy, France and Flanders 1916–1918, ANZAC, Landing at ANZAC, Defence at ANZAC, Suvla, Sari Bair–Lone Pine.
 World War II: Ioribaiwa, Kokoda Trail, Eora Creek–Templeton's Crossing II, Oivi–Gorari, Buna–Gona, Gona, Liberation of Australian New Guinea.

The 4th Battalion received the following battle honours:

 Second Boer War: South Africa 1900–02.
 First World War: ANZAC, Landing at ANZAC, Defence at ANZAC, Suvla, Sari Bair–Lone Pine, Somme 1916, Somme 1918, Pozieres, Bullecourt, Ypres 1917, Menin Road, Polygon Wood, Broodseinde, Poelcappelle, Passchendaele, Lys, Hazebrouck, Amiens, Albert 1918 (Chuignes), Hindenburg Line, Hindenburg Line, Epehy, France and Flanders 1916–1918.
 Second World War: South-West Pacific 1944–45, Liberation of Australian New Guinea, North Africa, Bardia 1941, Capture of Tobruk, Greece 1941, Veve, Soter,  Middle East 1941–1944, Crete, Heraklion, South-West Pacific 1942–1945, Liberation of Australian New Guinea, Wewak, Wirui Mission, Mount Shiburangu–Mount Tazaki.

Commanding Officers

Current composition

4/3 RNSWR currently consists of:

 Battalion Headquarters
 3 Rifle Companies – 'B', 'C' and 'D'
 Band 
 SPT Coy ( Signals PL)

Notes

References

External links
 4/3 RNSWR 

Infantry units and formations of Australia
Military units and formations established in 1987